The International Academy of Medical Acupuncture, founded in 1973 as Academy of Clinical Acupuncture, is a medical institute of higher learning in the United States. It was established in Kansas City, Mo. by  Dr. John A. Amaro. Already by 1974, the Academy of Clinical Acupuncture had given over 700 physicians a formal education in both Chinese and Japanese styles  of Acupuncture.

In February, 1978 it changed its name to International Academy of Medical Acupuncture, when it started giving certification by international programs, initially to Toronto, Canada.

Since 1979, over 1500 symposiums and Graduate School certification programs for over 20,000 participants from many different disciplines of physicians and health professionals.
There is a "Fellowship Certification" that can be obtained through the Academy. The participant must complete the one-year program, which involved seven 15-hour didactic modules as well as 200 hours of documented clinical applications. Certification can only be administered if the professional has either of the following degrees: M.D., D.O., D.C., N.D., DDS, or DPM.

References

External links 
 
 Acupuncture Titles and Abbreviations

Acupuncture organizations
1973 establishments in Missouri
Medical associations based in the United States
Medical and health organizations based in Arizona